American International School of Bolivia (AIS/B) is an American international school in Cochabamba, Bolivia. It serves grades Pre-Kindergarten–12.

References

External links
 American International School of Bolivia
  American International School of Bolivia

American international schools in Bolivia
Schools in Cochabamba
Association of American Schools in South America